The 1978–79 DFB-Pokal was the 36th season of the annual German football cup competition. It began on 4 August 1978 and ended on 23 June 1979. 128 teams competed in the tournament of seven rounds. In the final Fortuna Düsseldorf defeated Hertha BSC 1–0 after extra time.

Matches

First round

Replay

Second round

Replays

Third round

Replays

Round of 16

Replay

Quarter-finals

Semi-finals

Final

References

External links
 Official site of the DFB 
 Kicker.de 

1978-79
1978–79 in German football cups